Ndamira Catherine Atwikiire (born 13 August 1977) is a Ugandan politician and member of parliament. She was elected as a district woman representative for Kabale district under the ruling National Resistance Movement political party.

Work experience 
Currently, Atwikiire is a member of the Public Accounts Committee and Committee on Health. She previously worked as the financial administrator for VIDAS Engineering Services Co. Ltd. from 2010 to 2015.

In 2019, she was engaged in community outreach in the Kabale municipality where she urged the Muslim community to educate their children to meet the development concerns of the country.

References

Members of the Parliament of Uganda
Living people
1977 births
Women members of the Parliament of Uganda
National Resistance Movement politicians